Paige Conners (born 9 April 2000) is an American-Israeli pair skater. With her skating partner, Evgeni Krasnopolski, she is the 2017 CS Minsk-Arena Ice Star bronze medalist. She competed for Israel at the 2018 Winter Olympics in Figure Skating in pairs skating and a team event in Pyeongchang, South Korea.

Personal life 
Conners was born on April 9, 2000, in Pittsford, New York, United States, the daughter of Karen (a reading teacher) and Mark Conners (a dentist) Her mother, who is from Buffalo, has Israeli citizenship. She later moved to Edgewater, New Jersey. She has dual American-Israeli citizenship.

Career 
Conners began learning to skate in 2003. Representing Israel in ladies' singles, she placed 27th at the 2017 World Junior Championships in Taipei, Taiwan. She was coached by Galit Chait, Gilberto Viadana, and Michela Boschetto.

Switching to pair skating, Conners teamed up with Israel's Evgeni Krasnopolski in March 2017. The pair decided to train in Hackensack, New Jersey, coached by Galit Chait and Anton Nimenko.

Making their international debut, Conners/Krasnopolski placed 5th at the 2017 CS U.S. Classic in September. Later the same month, they placed 8th at the 2017 CS Nebelhorn Trophy, the final qualifying opportunity for the 2018 Winter Olympics. Due to their result, Israel received a spot in the Olympic pairs event. In October, the two won the bronze medal at the 2017 CS Minsk-Arena Ice Star.

In November 2017, Conners/Krasnopolski were named in Israel's Olympic team. In January 2018, they finished 9th at the 2018 European Championships in Moscow, Russia.

She competed for Israel at the 2018 Winter Olympics in Figure Skating in pair skating (coming in 19th) and a team event in Pyeongchang, South Korea.

Programs

Pair skating

Single skating

Competitive highlights 
CS: Challenger Series

Pairs with Krasnopolski

Ladies' singles

See also
 List of notable Jewish figure skaters

References

External links

 
 
 

2000 births
Jewish American sportspeople
Jewish Israeli sportspeople
Israeli female pair skaters
Israeli female single skaters
Living people
People from Pittsford, New York
People from Edgewater, New Jersey
Figure skaters at the 2018 Winter Olympics
Olympic figure skaters of Israel
American people of Israeli descent
21st-century American Jews